Mar Contreras (born Marisela Contreras Leyva on February 8, 1981, in Culiacán, Sinaloa, México) is a Mexican actress and singer.

Filmography

Discography
Sólo 5

References

External links

Facebook page of Mar Contreras

1981 births
Living people
Mexican telenovela actresses
Mexican television actresses
Mexican film actresses
Mexican stage actresses
Actresses from Sinaloa
Singers from Sinaloa
21st-century Mexican actresses
People from Culiacán
21st-century Mexican singers
21st-century Mexican women singers